

History

The 26th Alaska State Legislature was elected in November 2008.

Sessions
 First session: January 20, 2009 – May 19, 2009
 Special session: August 10, 2009
 Second session: January 19, 2010 – April 18, 2010

See also
List of Alaska State Legislatures
 25th Alaska State Legislature, the legislature preceding this one
27th Alaska State Legislature, the legislature following this one
 List of governors of Alaska
 List of speakers of the Alaska House of Representatives
 Alaska Legislature
 Alaska Senate
 {AKLeg.gov}

References

External links

All links listed below point to current pages related to the Alaska Legislature, not archives pertaining to this particular legislature.
Alaska Legislature website
Alaska Senate website
Alaska House of Representatives website
AK Senate Bipartisan Working Group website
The Republican Senate Caucus website
The House Majority website 
The House Democratic Legislators website

Alaska
2010 in Alaska
Alaska
Alaska legislative sessions